Scopula irrubescens is a moth of the  family Geometridae. It is found in Mexico.

References

Moths described in 1934
Taxa named by Louis Beethoven Prout
irrubescens
Moths of Central America